The following is a list of the all-time records for each of the 32 active National Hockey League (NHL) teams, beginning with the first NHL season (1917–18), with regular season stats accurate as of the end of all games on October 13, 2021, and playoff stats accurate as of the end of the 2020–21 NHL season and 2021 Stanley Cup playoffs. Teams are sorted by the overall percentage of points accumulated out of points available (two times the number of games played) throughout NHL history.

In the NHL's points system, a team is awarded 2 points for a win (regardless if earned in regulation,  overtime or shootout), 1 point for a tie, 1 point for an overtime loss, and 0 points for a loss. The overtime loss statistic (abbreviated as OL, OT, or OTL) was introduced into the NHL's points system in the 1999–2000 season. A commonly used term for the point awarded to a team for an overtime loss is a loser point. As a result of the 2004–05 NHL lockout, which canceled the entire 2004–05 season, the league adopted a shootout to determine the winner of a game which is still tied after an overtime period. This feature, introduced in the 2005–06 season, eliminated ties from the game.

Regular season
 

As of the end of the 2021–22 NHL regular season, the Montreal Canadiens have the most games played with (6,869). The Toronto Maple Leafs have one fewer game played, and having been in the league as long as Montreal, were tied with the Canadiens for the most games played. A discrepancy occurred during the 2021–22 season caused teams to play a different amount of games due to a mid-season suspension of play resulting from the onset of the COVID-19 pandemic. The Canadiens additionally lead all NHL franchises in wins (3,495), ties (837), and points (8,013). The Maple Leafs lead all NHL franchises in losses (2,850). 

The Vegas Golden Knights have the highest point percentage among active NHL teams (.622), while the Seattle Kraken have recorded the lowest point percentage (.366). Vegas and Seattle are the second-most recently and most-recently established franchises, respectively. Being the most recently established team in the NHL, the Seattle Kraken have the fewest games played among active NHL franchises (82), as well as the fewest wins (20), losses (49), overtime losses (6), and points (60). As both the Golden Knights and the Kraken began play after ties were eliminated from the NHL, both teams are tied with the fewest recorded (0). The Florida Panthers have recorded the most overtime losses (214).

Defunct franchises
Several NHL teams have since gone defunct. Many of them played in the NHL eras between the ceasing of the National Hockey Association in 1918 and the beginning of the NHL's Original Six era. The latter ended with the 1967 NHL expansion, when six teams joined the league. Of these 1967 expansion teams, only the Oakland Seals would later fold.

Among all defunct franchises, the Cleveland Barons recorded the most games played (858), losses (448), and ties (141). The Montreal Maroons recorded the most wins (271), while the New York Americans had the most points (637), and the original Ottawa Senators had the highest point percentage (.514). The Montreal Wanderers, having had their arena burn down during the first NHL season, have the fewest games played (6), wins (1), and points (2), as well as the lowest point percentage (.167). The Wanderers actually played just 4 of their 6 recorded games, as they defaulted two of them following their arena burning down but prior to their disbandment.

All now defunct NHL franchises folded prior to the advent of the NHL's overtime loss feature.

Playoffs

The Stanley Cup playoffs predate the National Hockey League's founding, and thus for the purpose of this listing, playoffs win–loss records prior to the 1918 Stanley Cup playoffs, which ended the 1917–18 NHL season, are not accounted for. As of the end of the 2021 Stanley Cup playoffs, which ended the 2020–21 NHL season, the Montreal Canadiens lead all active NHL teams in playoff appearances, having appeared in 85 of their 103 seasons played in the NHL,
and playoff games played, with 781. The Canadiens additionally lead all NHL teams in wins (447). The Edmonton Oilers lead all NHL teams, in terms of playoff winning percentage, as their 160–112 (.588) record is the highest. The Columbus Blue Jackets, being one of the more recently established NHL teams, have the fewest playoff games played (41). The Arizona Coyotes have the lowest playoff winning percentage, (.352). Additionally, the Boston Bruins lead all NHL franchises in playoff losses (337).

Overtime losses, not usually found in NHL playoff formats, were during the 2020 Stanley Cup playoffs, which had a seeding round-robin qualifying round as part of the Return to Play Plan implemented due to the COVID-19 pandemic.

Notes

References

Standings
NHL